Venezuela was one of the world's largest producers of oil, and the country with the largest proven oil reserves in the world.
Venezuela is a member of OPEC.

Electricity in Venezuela is predominantly produced from hydroelectricity.

Overview

Oil 

Venezuela ranked 11th in the world for oil production in 2016; production has since fallen steeply.

The largest oil company is Petróleos de Venezuela (PDVSA).

Oil fields in the country include Bolivar Coastal Field, Boscán Field, Maracaibo Basin and Orinoco Belt.

Electricity

Hydroelectricity 

Hydro power provided 74% of domestic electricity in 2008. 
Venezuela produced 87 TWh hydro power in 2008, 2.6% of the world total. 
Venezuela was top 8th in hydro electricity in 2008.

See also 

 List of renewable energy topics by country
 Nuclear energy in Venezuela

References